Borghini is a surname. Notable people with the surname include:
Vincenzo Borghini (1515–1580), Italian monk, artist, philologist, and art collector
  (1537 – 1588), Italian playwright and poet
Maria Selvaggia Borghini (1656–1731), Italian poet and translator
Giampiero Borghini (born 1943), Italian politician and translator
Paolo Longo Borghini (born 1980), Italian professional road bicycle racer
Elisa Longo Borghini (born 1991), Italian professional road cyclist
Diego Borghini (born 1997), Italian footballer

Italian-language surnames